Otradny (masculine), Otradnaya (feminine), or Otradnoye (neuter) is the name of several inhabited localities in Russia.

Republic of Adygea
As of 2012, two rural localities in the Republic of Adygea bear this name:
Otradny, Koshekhablsky District, Republic of Adygea, a khutor in Koshekhablsky District; 
Otradny, Takhtamukaysky District, Republic of Adygea, a settlement in Takhtamukaysky District;

Altai Krai
As of 2012, one rural locality in Altai Krai bears this name:
Otradnoye, Altai Krai, a selo in Semeno-Krasilovsky Selsoviet of Kytmanovsky District;

Belgorod Oblast
As of 2012, two rural localities in Belgorod Oblast bear this name:
Otradnoye, Belgorodsky District, Belgorod Oblast (or Otradny), a selo in Belgorodsky District; 
Otradnoye, Volokonovsky District, Belgorod Oblast, a settlement in Shidlovsky Rural Okrug of Volokonovsky District;

Bryansk Oblast
As of 2012, two rural localities in Bryansk Oblast bear this name:
Otradnoye, Bryansky District, Bryansk Oblast, a selo in Otradnensky Rural Administrative Okrug of Bryansky District; 
Otradnoye, Novozybkovsky District, Bryansk Oblast, a settlement in Starokrivetsky Rural Administrative Okrug of Novozybkovsky District;

Republic of Crimea
As of 2014, three inhabited localities in Republic of Crimea bear this name:

Urban localities
Otradnoye, Yalta, Republic of Crimea, an urban-type settlement under the administrative jurisdiction of the town of republic significance of Yalta

Rural localities
Otradnoye, Bakhchisaraysky District, Republic of Crimea, a selo in Bakhchisaraysky District
Otradnoye, Dzhankoysky District, Republic of Crimea, a selo in Dzhankoysky District

Irkutsk Oblast
As of 2012, one rural locality in Irkutsk Oblast bears this name:
Otradnaya, Irkutsk Oblast, a village in Alarsky District

Kaliningrad Oblast
As of 2012, three rural localities in Kaliningrad Oblast bear this name:
Otradnoye, Chernyakhovsky District, Kaliningrad Oblast, a settlement in Svobodnensky Rural Okrug of Chernyakhovsky District
Otradnoye, Guryevsky District, Kaliningrad Oblast, a settlement in Khrabrovsky Rural Okrug of Guryevsky District
Otradnoye, Ozyorsky District, Kaliningrad Oblast, a settlement in Novostroyevsky Rural Okrug of Ozyorsky District

Khabarovsk Krai
As of 2012, one rural locality in Khabarovsk Krai bears this name:
Otradnoye, Khabarovsk Krai, a selo in Vyazemsky District

Kostroma Oblast
As of 2012, one rural locality in Kostroma Oblast bears this name:
Otradny, Kostroma Oblast, a settlement in Pokrovskoye Settlement of Oktyabrsky District;

Krasnodar Krai
As of 2012, three rural localities in Krasnodar Krai bear this name:
Otradnoye, Krasnodar Krai, a selo in Solokhaulsky Rural Okrug under the administrative jurisdiction of Lazarevsky City District under the administrative jurisdiction of the City of Sochi; 
Otradnaya, Otradnensky District, Krasnodar Krai, a stanitsa in Otradnensky Rural Okrug of Otradnensky District; 
Otradnaya, Tikhoretsky District, Krasnodar Krai (or Otradnoye), a stanitsa in Otradnensky Rural Okrug of Tikhoretsky District;

Kurgan Oblast
As of 2012, one rural locality in Kurgan Oblast bears this name:
Otradnoye, Kurgan Oblast, a selo in Zaykovsky Selsoviet of Shchuchansky District;

Kursk Oblast
As of 2012, three rural localities in Kursk Oblast bear this name:
Otradnoye, Pristensky District, Kursk Oblast, a khutor in Sazanovsky Selsoviet of Pristensky District
Otradnoye, Solntsevsky District, Kursk Oblast, a village in Vorobyevsky Selsoviet of Solntsevsky District
Otradnoye, Timsky District, Kursk Oblast, a khutor in Stanovskoy Selsoviet of Timsky District

Leningrad Oblast
As of 2012, four inhabited localities in Leningrad Oblast bear this name:

Urban localities
Otradnoye, Kirovsky District, Leningrad Oblast, a town under the administrative jurisdiction of Otradnenskoye Settlement Municipal Formation in Kirovsky District; 

Rural localities
Otradnoye, Priozersky District, Leningrad Oblast, a settlement at the railway station in Plodovskoye Settlement Municipal Formation of Priozersky District; 
Otradnoye, Slantsevsky District, Leningrad Oblast, a village in Zagrivskoye Settlement Municipal Formation of Slantsevsky District; 
Otradnoye, Vyborgsky District, Leningrad Oblast, a settlement in Seleznevskoye Settlement Municipal Formation of Vyborgsky District;

Republic of Mordovia
As of 2012, one rural locality in the Republic of Mordovia bears this name:
Otradnoye, Republic of Mordovia, a selo in Otradnensky Selsoviet of Chamzinsky District;

Moscow Oblast
As of 2012, one rural locality in Moscow Oblast bears this name:
Otradnoye, Moscow Oblast, a settlement in Otradnenskoye Rural Settlement of Krasnogorsky District;

Oryol Oblast
As of 2012, one rural locality in Oryol Oblast bears this name:
Otradny, Oryol Oblast, a settlement in Zdorovetsky Selsoviet of Livensky District;

Penza Oblast
As of 2012, one rural locality in Penza Oblast bears this name:
Otradny, Penza Oblast, a settlement in Uspensky Selsoviet of Mokshansky District

Primorsky Krai
As of 2012, one rural locality in Primorsky Krai bears this name:
Otradnoye, Primorsky Krai, a selo in Mikhaylovsky District

Pskov Oblast
As of 2012, one rural locality in Pskov Oblast bears this name:
Otradnoye, Pskov Oblast, a village in Novosokolnichesky District

Rostov Oblast
As of 2012, two rural localities in Rostov Oblast bear this name:
Otradny, Rostov Oblast, a settlement in Krasnenskoye Rural Settlement of Bagayevsky District; 
Otradnoye, Rostov Oblast, a selo in Bolsheneklinovskoye Rural Settlement of Neklinovsky District;

Samara Oblast
As of 2012, one urban locality in Samara Oblast bears this name:
Otradny, Samara Oblast, a town, administratively incorporated as a town of oblast significance

Saratov Oblast
As of 2012, one rural locality in Saratov Oblast bears this name:
Otradnoye, Saratov Oblast, a settlement in Rtishchevsky District

Stavropol Krai
As of 2012, one rural locality in Stavropol Krai bears this name:
Otradny, Stavropol Krai, a settlement in Ovoshchinsky Selsoviet of Turkmensky District

Sverdlovsk Oblast
As of 2012, one rural locality in Sverdlovsk Oblast bears this name:
Otradny, Sverdlovsk Oblast, a settlement in Nikolo-Pavlovsky Selsoviet of Prigorodny District

Tomsk Oblast
As of 2012, one rural locality in Tomsk Oblast bears this name:
Otradny, Tomsk Oblast, a settlement in Asinovsky District

Tver Oblast
As of 2012, two rural localities in Tver Oblast bear this name:
Otradnoye, Oleninsky District, Tver Oblast, a village in Molodotudskoye Rural Settlement of Oleninsky District
Otradnoye, Torzhoksky District, Tver Oblast, a village in Sukromlenskoye Rural Settlement of Torzhoksky District

Volgograd Oblast
As of 2012, one rural locality in Volgograd Oblast bears this name:
Otradnoye, Volgograd Oblast, a settlement in Otradnensky Selsoviet of Mikhaylovsky District

Vologda Oblast
As of 2012, two rural localities in Vologda Oblast bear this name:
Otradnoye, Vologodsky District, Vologda Oblast, a village in Leskovsky Selsoviet of Vologodsky District
Otradnoye, Vozhegodsky District, Vologda Oblast, a selo in Maryinsky Selsoviet of Vozhegodsky District

Voronezh Oblast
As of 2012, two rural localities in Voronezh Oblast bear this name:
Otradnoye, Buturlinovsky District, Voronezh Oblast, a selo under the administrative jurisdiction of Buturlinovskoye Urban Settlement in Buturlinovsky District
Otradnoye, Novousmansky District, Voronezh Oblast, a settlement in Otradnenskoye Rural Settlement of Novousmansky District

Yaroslavl Oblast
As of 2012, two rural localities in Yaroslavl Oblast bear this name:
Otradny, Lyubimsky District, Yaroslavl Oblast, a settlement in Lyubimsky Rural Okrug of Lyubimsky District
Otradny, Uglichsky District, Yaroslavl Oblast, a settlement in Otradnovsky Rural Okrug of Uglichsky District

Notes